Guizhou cuisine, or Qian cuisine, consists of cooking traditions and dishes from Guizhou Province in southwestern China. Guizhou cuisine shares many features with Sichuan cuisine and Hunan cuisine, especially in bringing the sensation of spiciness and pungency. What makes Guizhou cuisine unique is the emphasis of a mixed sour-and-spicy taste, as compared to the numbing-and-hot sensation featured in Sichuan cuisine and the dry-hot taste featured in Hunan cuisine. There is an ancient local saying, "Without eating a sour dish for three days, people will stagger with weak legs". The saying reflects how Guizhou people love local dishes with a sour taste. The combination of sour and spicy flavours is also found in Shaanxi cuisine. Guizhou cuisine differs from Shaanxi cuisine in that it lacks the emphasis on the salty taste, which is a common trait found in most northern Chinese cuisines. In addition, the unique sourness featured in Guizhou cuisine comes from the local tradition of fermenting vegetables or grains, and not from using vinegar products.

Guizhou cuisine comprises many local varieties and dishes from ethnic minorities, such as the Miao people. Some famous local cuisines are represented by large cities like Guiyang, Zunyi, and Liupanshui.

Guizhou cuisine has matured since the beginning of the Ming dynasty.

Features 
Guizhou is famous for producing high-quality Chinese liquor, baijiu. One of the most famous and expensive baijiu in China, Maotai, is from Guizhou. Guizhou cuisine also features dishes specially cooked to match the flavour of locally produced liquor, such as preserved vegetables and steamed cured meat.

The pickled vegetables bring the sour sensation. Fresh vegetables are dried without exposure to sunlight after being cleaned. Afterwards, they are salted and sealed in containers for four or five days to allow proper fermentation. Pickled cabbage and radish are served as side dishes, commonly with wheat and rice noodle dishes.

The sour soup broth, representative of Guizhou cuisine with unique sourness, is a cooking heritage from the Miao people. It is the secret to create the famous Guizhou dish 'fish in sour soup'. The broth is normally made from the fermentation of rice, rice wine, wild tomatoes, red pepper, garlic and ginger.

Spicy dipping sauce is crucial in daily dining of Guizhou people. It is made by mixing chili pepper, garlic, ginger, green scallion, sesame oil or soy sauce, according to personal preference. One unique ingredient used in Guizhou dipping sauce is Houttuynia, which is loved by local people but not commonly accepted by other Chinese with its distinct taste. 

Various types of spiciness in Guizhou cuisine come from the art of using chili peppers in different ways by locals.  is created by heat-drying crushed chili pepper.  refers to both the uncooked mashed chili pepper paste and the chili sauce by simmering the paste in oil.  is made by preserving minced chili pepper with ginger and garlic.  is spice-flavored chili flakes. The renowned chili sauce brand Lao Gan Ma originated in Guizhou.

Notable dishes

References 

Regional cuisines of China
Culture in Guizhou